Sitiawan Airport  is an airport in Sitiawan, Manjung, Perak, Malaysia.

See also

 List of airports in Malaysia

References

External links

Airports in Perak
Manjung District